Granite Gear is an American outdoor company that sells backpacks, along with hiking and portage accessories.  The company was founded in 1986 by outdoorsmen Jeff Knight and Dan Cruikshank, based in Two Harbors, MN.

The company released a backpack designed for ultrahiker Justin "Trauma" Lichter, who logged more than 10,000 miles of hiking between November 2005 and 2006. Another group sponsored currently are "Greg and Deia", a pair hiking the Andes Mountain range,

History 
Granite Gear began near the Boundary Waters between Minnesota and Ontario. During a paddling trip through Quetico Provincial Park in 1986 Jeff Knight and Dan Cruikshank realized there was a need for better outdoor gear, a thought process that led to the founding of Granite Gear. Granite Gear grew into an internationally known brand that strives for a balance between functionality, weight, comfort and durability. Their products range from stuff sacks, to ultralight packs, to ultra-durable packs that meet the demands of soldiers.

Many of their backpacks are made with a molded, 3-dimensional frameplate. Released in 1996, it is made of composite carbon fiber and plastics and is designed to support the actual ruck of the backpack without other frame stays.

Environmentalism 
Granite Gear works closely with athletes in their field, garnering them notoriety in the hiking community.

Packing it Out

With the help of friends, Packing It Out Founder Seth Orme set off to inspire others by attempting ambitious clean-up efforts. In 2015 and 2016, the Packing It Out crew removed over 2,000 pounds of trash from two of America's best known scenic trails, the Appalachian Trail and Pacific Crest Trail. In 2017, Seth and friend Abigail Taylor biked 5,000 miles across the country and removed 2,100 pounds of trash, held 11 trash clean ups and inspired hundreds of thousands to leave the planet better. According to Orme, their mission is " continually evolving and we have a relentless passion to leave the people we meet and places we go better."

See also 
 List of Mountaineering Equipment Brands
 National Cleanup Day

References

External links
Official site
Deia and Gregg

Camping equipment manufacturers
Sporting goods retailers of the United States
Companies based in Minnesota
Hiking
Portages